The 1975 Atlantic hurricane season featured the first tropical storm to be upgraded to a hurricane based solely on satellite imagery – Hurricane Doris. The season officially began on June 1 and lasted until November 30. These dates conventionally delimit the period of each year when most tropical cyclones form in the Atlantic basin. The season was near average, with nine tropical storms forming, of which six became hurricanes. Three of those six became major hurricanes, which are Category 3 or higher on the Saffir–Simpson scale. The first system, Tropical Depression One, developed on June 24. Tropical Storm Amy in July caused minor beach erosion and coastal flooding from North Carolina to New Jersey, and killed one person when a ship capsized offshore North Carolina. Hurricane Blanche brought strong winds to portions of Atlantic Canada, leaving about $6.2 million (1975 USD) in damage. Hurricane Caroline brought high tides and flooding to northeastern Mexico and Texas, with two drownings in the latter.

The most significant storm of the season was Hurricane Eloise, a Category 3 hurricane that struck the Florida Panhandle at peak intensity, after bringing severe flooding to the Caribbean. Eloise caused 80 fatalities, including 34 in Puerto Rico, 7 in Dominican Republic, 18 in Haiti, and 21 in the United States, with 4 in Florida. The hurricane left about $560 million in damage in the United States. Hurricane Gladys, a Category 4 hurricane, was the most intense tropical cyclone of the season, but left little impact on land. Two tropical depressions also caused damage and fatalities. Collectively, the tropical cyclones of this season resulted in 87 deaths and about $564.7 million in damage.


Season summary 

The Atlantic hurricane season officially began on June 1, with the first tropical cyclone developing on June 24. Although 23 tropical depressions developed, only nine of them reached tropical storm intensity; this was near normal compared to the 1950–2000 average of 9.6 named storms. Six of these reached hurricane status, slightly above the 1950–2000 average of 5.9. Furthermore, three storms reached major hurricane status; above the 1950–2000 average of 2.3. Collectively, the cyclones of this season caused at least 84 deaths and over $564.7 million in damage. The Atlantic hurricane season officially ended on November 30, though the final cyclone became extratropical on December 13.

Tropical cyclogenesis began in June, with the development of a tropical depression on June 24, followed by Tropical Storm Amy on June 27. Four systems originated in July, including Hurricane Blanche. After Tropical Depression Six dissipated on July 30, tropical activity went dormant for over three weeks, ending with the development of Hurricane Caroline on August 24. Another cyclone, Hurricane Doris, also formed in August. September was the most active month of the season, featuring eight tropical cyclones, including hurricanes Eloise, Faye, and Gladys. In October, four systems formed, one of which intensified into Tropical Storm Hallie. Two tropical depressions developed in November. The last system, a subtropical storm, formed on December 6 and transitioned into an extratropical cyclone on December 13.

The season's activity was reflected with an accumulated cyclone energy (ACE) rating of 76. Broadly speaking, ACE is a measure of the power of a tropical storm multiplied by the length of time it existed. Therefore, a storm with a longer duration will have high values of ACE. Accordingly, tropical depressions are not included here. After the storm has dissipated, typically after the end of the season, the National Hurricane Center (NHC) reexamines the data. These revisions can lead to a revised ACE total either upward or downward compared to the operational value.

Systems

Tropical Storm Amy 

A trough of low pressure developed into a tropical depression while just north of Grand Bahama on June 27. The depression headed generally northward and remained weak. Upon nearing the coast of the Carolinas, the depression turned sharply eastward ahead of a rapidly approaching trough. Early on June 29, the system intensified into Tropical Storm Amy offshore North Carolina. During most of the storm's existence, Amy featured many subtropical characteristics – both tropical and extratropical characteristics – but was not classified as such due to the proximity to land. By July 4, the system moved southeast of Newfoundland before becoming extratropical. The remnants continued rapidly northeastward and soon dissipated.

Offshore North Carolina, a schooner carrying four people capsized on June 30, resulting in the death of the father of the other three crew members. They remained at sea for roughly 15 days before being rescued by a Greek merchant ship.

Hurricane Blanche 

A tropical wave emerged into the Atlantic Ocean from the west coast of Africa on July 14. The system remained weak for about a week, before convection began increasing significantly on July 21. It moved northwestward until early on July 26, when an approaching cold front and associated trough caused the depression to turn northeastward. Around that time, the cyclone intensified into Tropical Storm Blanche. A weakening cold front and baroclinic forces created an environment favorable for intensifying, allowing Blanche to become a Category 1 hurricane on July 27. The system quickly transitioned into an extratropical cyclone, which soon dissipated.

The strong winds knocked over two mobile homes and destroyed a slaughterhouse, which was under construction. Additionally, trees and power lines were downed, leaving between 500 and 1,000 customers without electricity. The electrical corporation in Nova Scotia suffered about $196,600 in damage. Telephone services were also interrupted. The A. Murray MacKay Bridge was closed after an oil rig broke loose and threatened to strike the bridge. In Prince Edward Island, flights to and from the Charlottetown Airport were canceled, as was ferry service to Nova Scotia. In the province, many homes and businesses lost telephone service. Overall, damage in Canada reached about $6.2 million.

Tropical Depression Six 

Once inland, the depression slowly weakened and re-curved northwestward on July 30 into Mississippi. Around that time, the depression dissipated. The remnants persisted at least until August 3, at which time it was situated over Arkansas.

Bay, Gulf, Holmes, Okaloosa, Santa Rosa, Wakulla, and Walton were hardest hit. Numerous roads were flooded and closed, with $3.2 million in damage to that infrastructure. About 500 homes suffered flood damage, 22 of which were destroyed. Damage is estimated to have reached $8.5 million in the state of Florida alone. In southern Alabama, overflowing rivers flooded several businesses and homes in Brewton and East Brewton. Damage in Alabama totaled approximately $300,000. In Mississippi, about 50 families in the vicinity of the Biloxi River were evacuated as the river threatened to exceed its banks, while at least 70 families fled their homes in Moss Point. Water entered about a dozen homes there. Further north, about 100 residences were evacuated in Canton, where some businesses suffered water damage. A total of 12 homes in Vicksburg were flooded. The storm left three fatalities, with two in Florida and one in Alabama.

Hurricane Caroline 

The depression moved west-southwestward and failed to intensify before crossing the Turks and Caicos Islands and making landfall along the northern coast in eastern Cuba on August 25. After emerging into the Caribbean Sea, the cyclone headed west-northwestward beginning on August 27. By the following day, the depression entered into the Gulf of Mexico after passing just offshore the Yucatán Peninsula. The system then intensified into Tropical Storm Caroline early on August 29 and hurricane by 00:00 UTC the following day. Around that time, Caroline made landfall in a rural area of Tamaulipas, located in northeastern Mexico. The system rapidly weakened and dissipated on September 1.

In Mexico, the storm produced  storm tides along the coast, while  of rain fell inland. Flooding rains forced 1,000 people to evacuate and left moderate damage to homes and businesses. The precipitation ended an eight-month drought that was affecting inland portions of northern Mexico and decreasing the area's corn production. Along the coast, several small villages sustained significant damage from the hurricane's storm surge. Brownsville broke a record for the highest amount of precipitation observed on a day in August. Two deaths occurred from drowning in Galveston.

Hurricane Doris 

A low pressure area developed within a frontal band over the central Atlantic on August 27. The subtropical classification was due to the lack of a central dense overcast (CDO), with the showers and thunderstorms mainly consisting of a strong band of convention located southeast of the center, as well as its association to the frontal band. Because the system was out of the authorized range of reconnaissance aircraft flights, satellites and ships were used to monitor the storm's intensity and tropical status. After satellite imagery indicated that the system became more symmetrical, developed CDO, and detached from the frontal system, the cyclone was reclassified as Tropical Storm Doris on August 29.

Doris made meteorological history when, on August 31, it became the first Atlantic hurricane ever to be upgraded to hurricane intensity solely on the basis of satellite pictures, via the Dvorak technique. The cyclone then curved northward and intensified further during the next few days, becoming a Category 2 hurricane early on September 2. By September 3, the hurricane began interacting with a non-tropical low pressure area. The extratropical remnants weakened and then dissipated late on September 4.

Hurricane Eloise 

A tropical wave developed into a tropical depression on September 13 to the east of the Virgin Islands. The system tracked westward and strengthened into Tropical Storm Eloise while passing to the north of Puerto Rico. Eloise briefly reached hurricane intensity soon thereafter, but weakened back to a tropical storm around landfall over Hispaniola. The cyclone emerged into open waters of the northern Caribbean Sea. After striking the northern Yucatán Peninsula, Eloise turned northward and re-intensified. In the Gulf of Mexico, the cyclone quickly deepened, becoming a Category 3 hurricane on September 23. The hurricane made landfall west of Panama City, Florida, before moving inland across Alabama and dissipating on September 24.

The storm produced heavy rainfall throughout Puerto Rico and Hispaniola, causing extensive flooding that left severe damage 59 fatalities. Thousands of people in these areas became homeless as flood waters submerged numerous communities. As Eloise progressed westward, it affected Cuba to a lesser extent. In advance of the storm, about 100,000 residents evacuated from the Gulf Coast region. The storm's severe winds, waves, and storm surge left numerous beaches, piers, and other coastal structures heavily impaired.

Wind-related damage extended into inland Alabama and Georgia. Further north, torrential rains along the entire East Coast of the United States created an unprecedented and far-reaching flooding event, especially into the Mid-Atlantic States. In that region, an additional 17 people died as a result of freshwater flooding from the post-tropical storm; infrastructural and geological effects were comparable to those from Hurricane Agnes three years prior. Across the United States, damage amounted to approximately $560 million. The storm killed 80 people along its entire track.

Hurricane Faye 

A tropical wave emerged into the Atlantic from the west coast of Africa on September 14. Moving northwestward, the depression intensified, according to ships and satellite imagery, becoming Tropical Storm Faye on September 19. The cyclone then moved westward and was unable to intensify further due to increasing wind shear, before weakening to a tropical depression on September 23. Shortly thereafter, Faye turned to the north, crossing an upper trough axis over the central Atlantic. Southwesterly flow aloft allowed the system to re-strengthen, with Faye becoming a tropical storm again on September 25. Faye accelerated to the northwest and deepened into a Category 1 hurricane early on September 26, several hours before reaching Category 2 intensity.

Already severely impacted by flooding from Eloise days earlier, New England prepared for additional flooding from Faye. The National Weather Service issued flash flood watches, resulting in more evacuations. Later that day, Faye curved northeast under strong westerly flow. Faye then curved eastward and lost tropical characteristics, becoming extratropical at 12:00 UTC on September 29, while situated northwest of Corvo Island in the Azores.

Hurricane Gladys 

A tropical wave emerged into the Atlantic from the west coast of Africa on September 17. Initially, the depression remained weak, but after encountering warm sea surface temperatures and low wind shear, it strengthened into Tropical Storm Gladys on September 24. Moving west-northwestward, the storm then entered a more unfavorable environment, mainly increased wind shear. Despite this, Gladys intensified into a Category 1 hurricane on September 28. Shortly thereafter, the storm reentered an area favorable for strengthening. A well-defined eye became visible on satellite imagery by September 30.

As the storm tracked to the east of the Bahamas, a curve to the north began, at which time an anticyclone developed atop the cyclone. Subsequently, the remnants merged with a large extratropical cyclone on October 3. Effects from the system along the East Coast of the United States were minimal, although heavy rainfall and rough seas were reported. In Newfoundland, strong winds and light precipitation were observed.

Tropical Depression Seventeen 

Moving around the western periphery of a subtropical ridge, the depression intensified while moving northeast towards the central Gulf Coast of the United States due to an advancing cold front. Early on October 17, the depression made landfall near Cocodrie, Louisiana. Shortly thereafter, the depression became an extratropical cyclone as it through the Southeast and Mid-Atlantic states, before moving offshore New England.

Flooding occurred across eastern Louisiana, central Mississippi, the western Florida Panhandle, central Tennessee, western Virginia, and eastern New York. In Jackson, Mississippi, the heavy precipitation established a new daily rainfall record for October 16 and a new 24-hour rainfall record for the month of October. Eight bridges were damaged in Jackson County, Tennessee, due to the floods. Heavy rains left heavy damage to the soybean and corn crops in Hickman and Marion counties in Tennessee. Six tornadoes were reported in association with this tropical depression, including two in Alabama, two in northwest Florida, and two in North Carolina. One person died due to flooding in Mississippi.

Tropical Storm Hallie 

A frontal trough exited the East Coast of the United States on October 18. The southern portion of the system became stationary near the Bahamas; simultaneously, a cut-off upper-level low formed in the same region. The disturbance produced scattered convection, until a tropical wave merged with it on October 23. The depression drifted northward on October 25 and eventually acquired tropical characteristics by October 26. Hallie accelerated to the northeast starting on October 26. Later that day, Hallie merged with a frontal zone and became extratropical offshore Virginia.

The precursor to Hallie produced extensive cloudiness precipitation in the Bahamas.
On October 27, gale warnings were issued for portions of the Outer Banks of North Carolina, and small craft advisories were posted for coastal areas from Georgia to Virginia. Additionally, the pressure gradient between Hallie and a high pressure area increased winds across much of the East Coast of the United States.

Subtropical Storm Two 

The storm moved rapidly southward and intensified, reaching maximum sustained winds of  about 24 hours later, based on observations from an unidentified ship. Shortly thereafter, sustained winds began decreasing. The system began moving southeastward and then eastward. By 12:00 UTC on December 12, the cyclone weakened to a subtropical depression.

Other systems 

In addition to the named storms and notable tropical depressions, several other minor tropical depressions developed during the season. On June 24, the first tropical depression developed over the central Atlantic. It tracked westward for two days, before executing a counter-clockwise loop. By June 28, the system had completed the loop and was tracking north. A third tropical depression formed northeast of the Bahamas on July 4. Tracking northeastward, the system did not intensify and was last noted over open waters midday on July 5. On July 24, the fifth tropical depression of the season formed over the southwestern Gulf of Mexico. Deep convection associated with the system persisted around the center of circulation. Forecasters anticipated the depression would intensify into a tropical storm before landfall. A reconnaissance mission into the cyclone found  winds; however, due to the interaction with land, the NHC did not upgrade the depression. Not long after forming, the depression struck Tampico, Tamaulipas. The system was no longer monitored by the NHC after landfall and quickly dissipated on July 26.

On September 3, two tropical depressions developed near Cabo Verde. The westernmost, designated Tropical Depression Eight, tracked generally westward and eventually dissipated near the Lesser Antilles on September 9. The easternmost, Tropical Depression Nine, also moved westward and dissipated on September 6. Another tropical depression developed near Bermuda on September 11. Initially, the depression drifted northeastward but later accelerated and dissipated by September 14. Tropical Depression Fifteen developed near the Gulf of Honduras on September 25 and tracked slowly westward. By September 28, the depression made landfall in northern Belize before dissipating two days later. A tropical depression developed to the west of the Canary Islands on October 3, moving northwestward and then northeastward before dissipating southwest of the Azores on October 5. Tropical Depression Eighteen formed on October 27 over the southwestern Caribbean Sea and tracked northwest. After turning nearly due west, the depression briefly made landfall near the Nicaragua–Honduras border and made another landfall in southern Belize shortly before dissipating on October 29. On November 8, a tropical depression developed off the coast of Honduras. Moving north-northwestward, the system gradually intensified. Over the following few days, the system gradually turned southward and made landfall in the southwestern edge of the Yucatán Peninsula on November 12, shortly before dissipating. In late November, another tropical depression formed over the central Atlantic. A short-lived system, it formed on November 29 and dissipated on December 1.

Storm names 
The following names were used for named storms (tropical storms and hurricanes) that formed in the North Atlantic in 1975. Storms were named Amy, Caroline, Doris, Eloise and Faye for the first time in 1975. The unused names Ingrid, Julia, Opal, and Vicky were later put onto modern naming lists.

Retirement 

The name Eloise was later retired.

Season effects 
This is a table of the storms in the 1975 Atlantic hurricane season. It mentions all of the season's storms and their names, landfall(s), peak intensities, damages, and death totals. Deaths in parentheses are additional and indirect (an example of such being a traffic accident or landslide), but are still related to that storm. The damage and death totals in this list include impacts when the storm was a precursor wave or post-tropical low, and all of the damage figures are in 1975 USD.

See also 

 List of Atlantic hurricanes
 Atlantic hurricane season
 1975 North Indian Ocean cyclone season
 1975 Pacific hurricane season
 1975 Pacific typhoon season
 Australian cyclone seasons: 1974–75, 1975–76
 South Pacific cyclone seasons: 1974–75, 1975–76
 South-West Indian Ocean cyclone seasons: 1974–75, 1975–76

References

External links 

 HPC Rainfall page for 1975 tropical cyclones
 Monthly Weather Review